This is a list of streams and rivers in Madagascar

A 
Andranotsimisiamalona River - Ankavanana - Antainambalana River

B 

Bemarivo River - Besokatra River - Betsiboka River - Bombetoka River

F 
Fanambana River - Faraony River - Fiherenana River

I 

Iazafo - Ifasy River - Ihosy River - Ikopa River - Irodo River - Ivondro River

L 

Linta River - Loky River - Lokoho River - Loky River

M 

Mahajamba River - Mahajilo River - Mahavavy River - Manajeba River - Manambaho River - Manambolo River - Manampatrana River - Mananara River  (south) - Mananara River (Analanjirofo) - Mananjary River - Mananjeba River - Mandrare River - Mangoky River - Mangoro River - Mania River - Maningory River - Marimbona  - Menarandra River - Morondava River

N 

Namorona River - Nosivolo River

O 

Onilahy River - Onive River - Onive River (Sava)

R 
Ramena River - Rianila River

S 
Sahamaitso -  Saharenana River - Sahatandra - Sahatavy River - Sakaleona River - Sakanila River - Sakay river - Sahamaitso - Sakeny River  - Sambirano River - Sandrananta River - Sandrangato - Simianona River - Sofia River

T 

Tahititnaloke River - Tsaratamana - Tsiribihina River

Z 
Zomandao River

See also
 List of bridges in Madagascar

Madagascar
Rivers